The Yukon Freedom Party is a territorial political party in Yukon, Canada. Its founder and leader is Joseph Zelezny who was previously the People's Party of Canada candidate for Yukon in the 2019 Canadian federal election.

The party formed and registered with Elections Yukon in November 2021. In the remaining weeks of 2021, the party raised $8,149.

Yukon premier Sandy Silver has suggested that the party's existence has exerted considerable pressure on the Yukon Party.

In 2022, Zelezny attended some convoy protests in the territory organized by a citizens group called "Yukon Freedom". The party denied any connection between the party and the protest organizers, saying that Zelezny was not an organizer, and that the similarity to the party's name was coincidental.

References 

Political parties in Canada
2021 establishments in Canada